The 1996 Baotou earthquake (1996年包头地震) occurred on May 3, 1996, at 11:32 local time (03:32 UTC). The epicenter was located near Baotou, Inner Mongolia, China. It had a magnitude of  6.4. The earthquake killed 26 people, injured 453, and left 196,633 homeless.

The earthquake was located close to the western suburbs of Baotou, and it was considered a typical urban earthquake. A landslide in Hademen Gold Mine (哈德门金矿) caused six deaths. There was damage to electricity infrastructure. Liquefaction was reported in the low swamps along both sides of the Yellow River. Anomalies in gas radon and water mercury were observed before the earthquake. However, many of the anomalies were observed in Linhe, Baynnur, but the earthquake occurred near western Baotou. Besides in Inner Mongolia, the earthquake could be felt in Beijing, Shaanxi, and Shanxi of China as well as in Mongolia. There was a large historical earthquake in 849 around the Hetao region, and some researchers located it in eastern Baotou.

The earthquake, which destroyed many old houses, led to the reconstruction of Baotou. In 2002, the Baotou Municipal Government was awarded by UN-HABITAT for the improvements in shelter and the urban environments.

References

Further reading

External links 

1996 earthquakes
1996 disasters in China
Earthquakes in China
History of Inner Mongolia